Martinópolis is a municipality in the state of São Paulo in Brazil. The population is 26,628 (2020 est.) in an area of 1254 km². The elevation is 488 m.

Famous people 

 Ary Toledo, (1937), humorist, singer, showman. And Youtuber Felipe Hayashii.

Bibliography 

 José Carlos Daltozo, Martinópolis, Sua História e Sua Gente, 1999

References

External links 
  Population data 2007
  Official Website of Municipality
  Martinópolis AOVIVO

Municipalities in São Paulo (state)